Raul Marco Sison (born July10, 1957) is a Filipino singer, actor, and politician.

Singing career
Sison started his singing career after his triumph on a singing contest on GMA Network's noontime variety show Student Canteen in the late 1970s and early 1980s. Being one of the classic balladeers to have captured the true vocal essence of OPM in the '80s, Sison was responsible for the songs "My Love Will See You Through" [his biggest hit thus far], "Si Aida, Si Lorna, O Si Fe", "I'll Face Tomorrow", "Always" and "Make Believe".

In 1991, the Philippine independent record company, Universal Records, released Best of Marco Sison. The album consists entirely of romantic, easy-listening music, a style of music quite popular in the Philippines. In 1992, Sison released After All These Years. In 1999, Sison released Memories, his first album for local independent record company, Viva Music Group. One of the international hits covered by Sison in the said album is Crazy. The album also includes Someone That I Used To Love and Kung Maibabalik Ko Lang.

May Iba Ka Na Ba? is the first single lifted from Sison's comeback album, Hindi Ko Akalain, released by Star Records. The songs in the album perfectly captures that distinct OPM feel as proven in the tracks Hindi Ko Akalain, Baby, Puwede Ba?, Right Beside You, Try My Number and the lead single "May Iba Ka Na Ba?".

The singer was simply doing live performances both here in the country and abroad. Sison has been part of the touring group called The Greatest Hitmakers composed of veteran OPM artists Rico J. Puno, Hajji Alejandro and Rey Valera.

Aside from his hit-making albums, Sison also joined popular singers Rico J. Puno, Rey Valera and Nonoy Zuñiga, collectively known as the Hitmakers. Sison and the group had a successful series of shows abroad, most of them in the U.S. cities such as Reno, Houston and Las Vegas. Sison emerges on the release of his love ballad collection titled Isang Pagkakataon, distributed by PolyEast Records. The album has been preceded by other newly written songs by Vehnee Saturno like Selos, Kahit Na Minsan Pa, Sa Iisang Puso Mo and Kwento. It also features Sabik Na Puso, a song that was penned by Sison. Isang Pagkakataon features five new songs from Vehnee Saturno.

Acting career
Aside from singing, Marco Sison was also into movie acting. His first movie was the romantic drama Beautiful Girl by Seiko Films, released in 1990.

His second movie was José Rizal, where he plays national hero Pio Valenzuela who accompanied the titular national hero (played by Cesar Montano). It was released by GMA Films on June 12, 1998 during the Philippine Independence's 100th anniversary. The movie also won as Best Festival Movie in the 1998 Metro Manila Film Festival.

His third movie is a wackiest comedy movie (and also Marco's 1st comedy movie), Who's That Girl, where made his special participation in the film as a funeral singer.

Political career
Sison served as a municipal councilor of Biñan for two terms. He initially planned to run for vice governor of Laguna in 2001 but decided to instead retire from politics and give way to Dan Fernandez, who would go on to win the election.

He then served as provincial board member from the 1st district of Laguna for one term from 2004 to 2007. In 2007, he ran for vice governor of Laguna as the running mate of incumbent Governor Teresita S. Lazaro, but lost to Ramil Hernandez. After his loss, he migrated to Los Angeles with his family.

Discography

Best of Marco Sison (1991)
My Love Will See You Through 
Si Aida, Si Lorna, O Si Fe
Ibigay Mo Sa Akin Ang Bukas
Make Believe
Always
I'll Face Tomorrow
Mahal
Isusumbong Kita Sa Diyos

After All These Years (1992)
I Love You So
After All These Years
Awit Ka Ng Puso
Miss Manikin
Tulay Ng Buhay
Sadyang Mahal Kita
Mahal Kita
Call It Love
Kahit Hindi Mahal
Endlessly

Memories (1999)
Morning Girl
Crazy
Kung Alam Ko Lang
 I Love You All The Way
 Looking Through The Eyes Of Love
One More Try
Kung Maibabalik Ko Lang
One Day
All At Once
A Very Special Love
Someone That I Used to Love
Where Is Tomorrow

Maghihintay Na Lamang (2000)
Magmula Noon
Ang Pag-ibig Ko
Maghihintay Na Lamang
Paano Mapipigilan
Words Get In The Way
 Wala Na Bang Pag-ibig
Tayo Na
I Think I'll Tell Her
Iisa Pa Lamang
Knocks Me Off My Feet
Paalam Na
If We Never Said Goodbye

Best of Marco Sison 2 (2004)
Make Believe
Through the Years
Lady
Somewhere Down the Road
If I Should Love Again
Send in the Clowns
One Hundred Ways
Think I'm In Love Again
Doors
Feeling
Mahal
Landas

Hindi Ko Akalain (2010)
Try My Number
Hindi Ko Akalain
May Iba Ka Na Ba?
Don't Know How Long I'll Be Away
Baby, Puwede Ba?
Right Beside You
Friend Of Mine
I Don't Want To Be Your Friend
Huwag Na Lang
Till I Met You

Isang Pagkakataon (2012)
Selos
Kahit Na Minsan Pa
Sa Iisang Puso Mo
Kwento
Sabik Na Puso

See also
Pilipinas Win Na Win
APO Hiking Society

References

External links
Marco Sison: After All These Years at www.allmusic.com/album/after-all-these-years-mw0001159626

Living people
20th-century Filipino male singers
1957 births
People from Tagbilaran
People from Laguna (province)
People from Biñan
Singers from Bohol
Male actors from Bohol
PolyEast Records artists
Star Music artists
Members of the Laguna Provincial Board
Lakas–CMD (1991) politicians
21st-century Filipino male singers